Pictures in a Frame is an album by American jazz drummer Max Roach recorded in 1979 for the Italian Soul Note label.

Reception
The Allmusic review by Scott Yanow awarded the album 4 stars stating "Although the group would continue to grow and evolve, it was already a pretty impressive unit by 1979. As usual with Max Roach's bands, this group filled the gap between hard bop and the avant-garde".

Track listing
All compositions by Max Roach except as indicated
 "Reflections" - 3:36 
 "Mwalimu" (Odean Pope) - 8:16 
 "A Place of Truth" - 4:11 
 "China's Waltz" (Calvin Hill) - 4:27 
 "Mail Order" (Pope) - 3:26 
 "Japanese Dream" (Clifford Jordan) - 3:40 
 "Magic" (Cecil Bridgewater) - 5:08 
 "Back to Basics" (Hill) - 3:56 
 "Ode from Black Picture Show" - 3:27 
Recorded at Barigozzi Studio in Milano, Italy on September 10, 11 & 17, 1979

Personnel
Max Roach - drums, piano, vocals
Cecil Bridgewater - trumpet, flugelhorn
Odean Pope - tenor saxophone
Calvin Hill - bass

References

Black Saint/Soul Note albums
Max Roach albums
1979 albums